Acton Main Line is a railway station on the Great Western Main Line in Acton, west London. The station is served by the Elizabeth line, and managed by Transport for London. The station was rebuilt with step-free access as part of the Crossrail project. It is Travelcard Zone 3.

History
The Great Western Main Line opened through Acton in 1838, however the Great Western Railway (GWR) was initially focused on long distance traffic. The station was opened by the GWR on 1 February 1868. Originally simply named Acton, it was operated by the Western Region of British Railways following nationalisation in 1948. On 26 September 1949 it was renamed Acton Main Line. When sectorisation was introduced, the station was served by Network SouthEast until the privatisation of British Railways in 1994.

Together with the underground stations at West Acton and North Acton, Acton Main Line serves the GWR garden estate. This large area of family housing, bordered on three sides by the stations named and on the fourth side by the A40 road, was developed by GWR in the 1920s to accommodate its staff, particularly drivers from the Old Oak Common depot.

By 1947 the station had four platforms, all partially covered along their length by wooden canopies, as well as a siding next to platform 1. Both platform 1 and its siding were demolished in the late 1960s, whilst the imposing Victorian station building was pulled down and replaced with a small booking office in 1974. Platform canopies were also removed, with platforms numbered 2, 3 and 4. The platform 1 permanent way is still intact, and is used as a fast through line for non-stopping trains; all trains on the Great Western Main Line pass through the station. The frequency of trains was also reduced in the 1960s to a peak hour only service.

In the 1990s, the Great Western Main Line was electrified through Acton Main Line as part of the Heathrow Express project. A new station building was completed in early 1996, during extensive renovation of the adjacent bridge on Horn Lane. In 2004, a cut in the number of services to 2 trains an hour by First Great Western Link was criticised by local residents, who called for the station to be served by Crossrail services. In 2008, Oyster pay as you go became available for passengers at the station.

Acton Yard 

The Great Western Railway built a large freight marshalling yard adjacent to the station in the late nineteenth century. It was one of a series of such yards on the perimeter of London used for the transfer of freight between railways. The yard continues in use but on a much reduced scale.

Crossrail 
Acton Main Line was first proposed to be part of the Crossrail project in the 1990s. In 2003, initial public consultation proposed that no Crossrail services would stop at the station. In 2004, it was proposed that services would call at the station 7 days a week, but no stations improvements were planned. The number of seats available into Central London from the station would double, due to longer and more frequent trains. Following criticism, it was announced in 2005 that a new station building and step free access would be built as part of the project.

In May 2011, Network Rail announced that it would deliver improvements and alterations to prepare the station for Crossrail services. In 2016, the station design was completed, and submitted to Ealing Council for approval. The work would include a new station building designed by Bennetts Associates with level access from Horn Lane, platform extensions, new platform canopies and step-free access to all platforms. Outside the station, public realm improvements funded by Transport for London and Ealing Borough Council would include a new roundabout with zebra crossings, widened pavements, street trees and covered cycle parking.

In mid-2013 a gated barrier was built along the entire length of platforms 2 and 3, protecting passengers from the fast lines. In June 2017, it was announced that completion of the station was delayed until 2019. In December 2017, MTR Crossrail took over management of the station from Great Western Railway, with TfL Rail services running from May 2018 in preparation for the full operation of the Elizabeth line. In 2019, contracts for the new station building was awarded, allowing construction of the new station building.

Following delays due to the COVID-19 pandemic, the refurbished station opened on 18 March 2021, providing step free access to all platforms.

Services

All services at Acton Main Line are operated by the Elizabeth line using  EMUs.

The typical off-peak service in trains per hour is:
 4 tph to 
 2 tph to 
 2 tph to 

A Sunday service was introduced at the station in May 2019. Prior to this, the station was closed on Sundays.

Connections
London Buses routes 260, 266, 440 and night route N266 serve the station.

References

External links

Railway stations in the London Borough of Ealing
Great Western Main Line
Railway stations in Great Britain opened in 1868
Former Great Western Railway stations
Railway stations served by the Elizabeth line
Acton, London
DfT Category E stations